Silvia Mazzieri (Pisa, 23 February 1993) is an Italian actress, especially known for her appearances in RAI television series.

Life and career
Mazzieri was born on 23 February 1993 in Pisa and spent her childhood and adolescence in Abbadia San Salvatore in Siena. A competitive sprinter at a young age, she also showed an early aptitude for the show business.

After high school, and encouraged by her family, Mazzieri entered the Miss Italia contest in 2010, where she was voted Miss Cinema.

Later, she began to study acting, initially in the theatre Il Genio della Lampada of Florence until 2011, then in the acting and voice acting academy Actor's Planet of Rome until 2014, and finally in Gisella Burinato’s C.I.A.P.A. Acting School in Rome until 2015. During those years, Mazzieri acted in advertisements and short film projects, including L'amore ormai (2014). 

In 2015, she appeared in the sixth season of Provaci ancora prof! In 2015–2016, Mazzieri played Bella, the friend and later girlfriend of one of the main characters, in the second and third season of Braccialetti rossi. Mazzieri also worked in Il paradiso delle signore as Silvana Maffeis, a cineophile salesgirl and fan of Audrey Hepburn’s, who dreams of becoming a famous actress.

In 2017, she was in La strada di casa as a woman, Irene Ghilardi, carrying out an investigation into her brother's suspicious death.

In 2020, she started playing Alba Patrizi, a medical resident, in Doc - Nelle tue mani. In the same year, she started playing Giada Ruggero in Vivi e lascia vivere.

In 2021, she played Claudia in the movie Bentornato papà.

On 1 June 2022, Mazzieri gives birth to her first child, Greta.

Filmography

Television
 Provaci ancora prof!
 Braccialetti rossi
 Il paradiso delle signore
 La strada di casa
 Doc - Nelle tue mani
 Vivi e lascia vivere

Cinema
 Bentornato papà

Short films
 L'amore ormai

References

Living people
1993 births
Italian television actresses
21st-century Italian actresses